Start TV is an American free-to-air television network owned as a joint venture between Weigel Broadcasting and the CBS News and Stations subsidiary of Paramount Global. Predominantly carried on the digital subchannels of its affiliated television station in most markets, it primarily airs classic television drama series from the 1980s through the 2000s, with a focus on women-led dramas, police and legal procedurals. The network originates from Weigel Broadcasting's headquarters on North Halsted Street in Chicago, Illinois.

History
On July 18, 2018, CBS Television Stations and Weigel Broadcasting announced the formation of Start TV, with plans to launch the network on Labor Day of that year (September 3). The network initially debuted on the subchannels of five of Weigel's TV stations, three stations owned by Bahakel Communications, 17 CBS TV stations, and three CW owned-and-operated stations.

Weigel indicated that CBS suggested the idea for the network to allow more modern programming not being carried by cable networks or streaming services to find a place to air. Start TV officially launched on September 3, 2018, at 6:00 a.m. Eastern Time, with the pilot episode of Touched by an Angel ("The Southbound Bus") as its inaugural broadcast. Varietys 2019 Nielsen ratings list showed that Start TV averaged 114,000 viewers in prime time, up 65% from the 2018 average.

Programming
Similar to its male-targeted sister network Heroes & Icons (H&I), Start TV airs legal/police procedurals and various other dramas - but instead targeting a female audience, featuring shows led by/centered around women. The network features series from the 1980s to the 2000s, and runs a uniform programming schedule with shows airing mainly at the same time seven days a week. Start TV also has a one-hour block of E/I children's programming on Sunday mornings between 8 a.m. and 9 a.m. Eastern Time in order to fulfill FCC obligations.

Current programs
 The Closer (September 3, 2018 present)
 Cold Case (September 3, 2018 present)
 Medium (September 3, 2018 present)
 Touched by an Angel (September 3, 2018 present)
 Dr. Quinn, Medicine Woman (September 3, 2018 present)
 Crossing Jordan (January 1, 2019 present)
 Unforgettable (January 1, 2019 present)
 The Good Wife (January 1, 2019 present)
 Ghost Whisperer (April 29, 2019 present)
 In Plain Sight  (October 14, 2019 present)
 Any Day Now (August 31, 2020 present)
 Major Crimes (August 31, 2020 present)
 Rizzoli & Isles (January 4, 2021 present)
 CSI: Cyber  (December 27, 2021 present)
 Beauty & the Beast  (December 27, 2021 present)
 1-800-MISSING/Missing (April 18, 2022 - present)
 Providence (January 1, 2023 - present)

Source:

E/I programming
 Elizabeth Stanton's Great Big World

Affiliates
, Start TV has affiliation agreements with television stations in 27 media markets encompassing 20 states, covering 45.52% of the United States. The network is carried on the digital subchannels of television stations in most of its markets (with potential exceptions in certain areas where a future affiliate may opt to carry the network on its main feed), and is also carried on cable television providers through their digital tiers at the discretion of the affiliate's parent station in certain markets. The network initially launched primarily on subchannels of stations owned by Weigel Broadcasting and CBS Television Stations. (In many of the CBS markets, Start TV displaced Weigel and CBS's classic television network venture Decades, with Weigel assuming the local Decades affiliation rights on stations it owns in certain markets where CBS Television Stations owns a CBS and/or CW owned-and-operated station, such as Los Angeles and San Francisco.) Bahakel Communications also contributed stations to serve as charter affiliates.

In South Bend, Indiana (where Weigel Broadcasting owns ABC affiliate WBND-LD, CW affiliate WCWW-LD and MyNetworkTV affiliate WMYS-LD) and Milwaukee, Wisconsin (where Weigel owns CBS affiliate WDJT-TV, independent station WMLW, MeTV owned-and-operated station WBME-CD and Telemundo affiliate WYTU-LD), the network displaced This TV on WCWW-LD2 and WYTU-LD3, effectively leaving that network without an affiliate in either market. (Weigel – which was part-owner of that network from its founding in October 2008 – had continued to hold the This TV affiliation rights for the Milwaukee market after Tribune Broadcasting assumed Weigel's interest and operational responsibilities in the network in November 2013; Tribune's former Milwaukee station, WITI, never claimed the This TV affiliation in the market despite Weigel moving the This affiliation to lower-tier channel slots several times.)

In October 2020, Start TV was made available on Sling TV. On April 19, 2022, Start TV began airing on the Frndly TV live streaming service.

Current affiliates

Former affiliates

References

External links
 

Television networks in the United States
Women's interest channels
Start TV
English-language television stations in the United States
Joint ventures
CBS News and Stations
Weigel Broadcasting
Television channels and stations established in 2018
2018 establishments in the United States